This is a comprehensive list of flags used in Switzerland.

National flags

Ethnic group flags

Military flags

Rank flags

Political flags

Canton flags

Historical flags

Switzerland Under The Holy Roman Empire

Historical National Flags

Swiss Territories Under Prussian Rule

Swiss Territories Under Austrian Rule

Swiss Territories Under French Rule

Swiss Territories Under Italian States

Yacht club flags

See also 

 Flag of Switzerland
 Coat of arms of Switzerland

References 

Flags of Switzerland
Lists and galleries of flags
Flags